The Streptomyces aureofaciens Phage Mu1/6 Holin (Mu1/6 Holin) Family (TC# 1.E.28) is a family of putative pore-forming holins between 80 and 90 amino acyl residues in length with 2 transmembrane segments (TMSs). A representative list of proteins belonging to this family can be found in the Transporter Classification Database.

See also 
 Streptomyces aureofaciens
 Holin
 Lysin

References

Further reading 

 
 

Protein families
Membrane proteins
Transmembrane proteins
Transmembrane transporters
Transport proteins
Integral membrane proteins